Tangier is a city in Morocco.

Tangier or Tangiers may also refer to:

Entertainment
Tangier (1946 film), a black-and-white Universal Pictures film
Tangier (1982 film), an American-Moroccan film
Tangiers, a fictional casino in the 1995 film Casino
Tangier (band), an American hard rock, glam metal and southern rock band
Tangier (album), a 2010 album by Billy Thorp
Tangiers (band), a Canadian indie rock band

Places
Tangier, Nova Scotia, a rural town in Nova Scotia, Canada
Tangier, Indiana,  an unincorporated community in Indiana, U.S.
Tangier, Oklahoma, an unincorporated community in Oklahoma, U.S.
Tangier, Virginia, a town on Tangier Island in the Chesapeake Bay in Virginia, U.S.
 Tangier Sound, an inlet of the Chesapeake Bay in Maryland, U.S.

Ships
 USS Tangier (SP-469), a patrol vessel in commission from 1917 to 1918
 USS Tangier (AV-8), a seaplane tender in commission from 1941 to 1947

See also
English Tangier, a colony from 1661 to 1684
Tanger (disambiguation)
Tangier disease, a rare inherited disorder
Tangier International Zone, city-state under international administration between 1924–1956
USS Tangier, a list of ships